Kubyakovo (Köbäk) is a rural locality (a village) in Kunakbayevsky Selsoviet, Uchalinsky District, Bashkortostan, Russia. The population was 12 as of 2010. There is one street.

Geography 
Kubyakovo is located 25 km west of Uchaly (the district's administrative centre) by road. Iltebanovo is the nearest rural locality.

References 

Rural localities in Uchalinsky District